Shek Wai Kok Estate is a public housing estate in Shek Wai Kok, Tsuen Wan, New Territories, Hong Kong, near Shing Mun Valley and Luk Yeung Sun Chuen. It consists of 8 residential buildings completed in 1980 to 1982.

History
On 28 September 1982, then Prime Minister of the United Kingdom Margaret Thatcher visited the estate to contact with the public by residents of the estate.

On 14 March 2001, Leung Shing-yan died after being shot by Tsui Po-ko at Flat 552, Shek To House Block B, Shek Wai Kok Estate. The incident caused a sensation in Hong Kong society.

Houses

Demographics
According to the 2016 by-census, Shek Wai Kok Estate had a population of 16,605. The median age was 51.1 and the majority of residents (98 per cent) were of Chinese ethnicity. The average household size was 2.6 people. The median monthly household income of all households (i.e. including both economically active and inactive households) was HK$20,000.

Politics
For the 2019 District Council election, the estate fell within two constituencies. Most of the estate is located in the Shek Wai Kok constituency, which is represented by Man Yu-ming, while the remainder of the estate falls within the Cheung Shek constituency, which is represented by Matthew Lai Man-fai.

See also

Public housing estates in Tsuen Wan

References

Tsuen Wan
Public housing estates in Hong Kong